Chun Doo-hwan (or  ; 18 January 1931 – 23 November 2021) was a South Korean army general and military dictator who ruled as an unelected strongman from 1979 to 1980 before replacing Choi Kyu-hah as president of South Korea from 1980 to 1988.

Chun usurped power after the 1979 assassination of president Park Chung-hee, a military dictator who had ruled since 1962. Chun orchestrated the 12 December 1979 military coup, then cemented his military dictatorship in the 17 May 1980 military coup in which he declared martial law and later set up a concentration camp for "purificatory education". He established the highly authoritarian Fifth Republic of Korea on 3 March 1981. After the June Struggle democratization movement of 1987, Chun conceded to allowing the December 1987 presidential election. It was won by his close friend and ally Roh Tae-woo, who would continue many of Chun's policies during his own rule into the 1990s.

In 1996, Chun was sentenced to death for his role in the Gwangju Massacre which led to the deaths of hundreds, possibly thousands, of citizens. Chun was pardoned the following year, along with Roh Tae-woo who had been sentenced to 17 years, by President Kim Young-sam, on the advice of the incoming President-elect Kim Dae-jung whom Chun's administration had sentenced to death some 20 years earlier. Both Chun and Roh were fined $203 million and $248 million respectively, amounts that were embezzled through corruption during their regimes, which were mostly never paid.

In his final years, Chun was criticized for his unapologetic stance and the lack of remorse for his actions as a dictator and his wider regime. Chun died on 23 November 2021 at the age of 90 after a relapse of myeloma.

Early life and education
Chun was born on 18 January 1931 in Yul-Gok myeon, a poor farming town in Hapcheon County, South Gyeongsang Province, Korea. Chun Doo-hwan's family is from the Wonsan Jeon Clan. His 14th generation ancestor, Jeon Je was a military officer who was executed for violating the orders of Gwon Yul during the Imjin War. Chun Doo-hwan was the fourth son out of ten children to Chun Sang-woo and Kim Jeong-mun. Chun's oldest two brothers, Yeol-hwan and Kyuu-gon, died in an accident when he was an infant. Chun grew up knowing his remaining older brother Ki-hwan and his younger brother Kyeong-hwan.

Around 1936, Chun's family moved to Daegu, where he began attending Horan Elementary School. Chun's father had run-ins with the kempeitai in the past; in the winter of 1939 he murdered a police captain. Their family immediately fled to Jilin, Manchukuo, where they stayed in hiding for two years before returning. When Chun finally started attending elementary school again, he was two years behind his original classmates.

In 1947, Chun began attending Daegu Vocational Middle School, located nearly 25 km from his home. Chun moved on to Daegu Vocational High School.

Military career
After graduating from high school in 1951, Chun gained entry into the Korea Military Academy (KMA). While there, he made several key friends among the students who would later play instrumental roles in helping Chun seize control of the country. He graduated in February 1955 with a Bachelor of Science degree and a commission as a second lieutenant in the 11th class of the KMA. He later trained in the United States, specializing in guerilla tactics and psychological warfare, and married Lee Soon-ja, the daughter of the KMA's commandant at the time of his attendance, in 1958.

Chun, then a captain, led a demonstration at the KMA to show support for the May 16 coup in 1961 led by Park Chung-hee. Chun was subsequently made secretary to the commander of the Supreme Council for National Reconstruction, placing him directly under Park. Chun was quickly promoted to major in 1962, while continuing to make powerful friends and acquaintances. As a major, Chun was the deputy chief of operations for the Special Warfare Command's battle headquarters, and later worked for the Supreme Council for Reconstruction again as the Chief Civil Affairs Officer. In 1963, Chun was given a position in the Korean Central Intelligence Agency (KCIA) as Personnel Director. By 1969, he was senior advisor to the Army Chief of Staff.

In 1970, holding the rank of colonel, Chun became the commander of the 29th Regiment, South Korean 9th Infantry Division, and participated in the Vietnam War. Upon returning to Korea in 1971, he was given command of the 1st Special Forces Brigade (Airborne) and later promoted to brigadier general. In 1976 he worked as the deputy chief of the Presidential Security Service and was promoted to the rank of major general during his time there. In 1978 he became the commanding officer of the 1st Infantry Division.

Finally, in 1979, he was appointed commander of Security Command, his highest position yet.

Rise to power

Hanahoe
Chun formed Hanahoe as a secret military club shortly after his promotion to general officer. It was predominantly composed of his fellow graduates from the 11th class of the Korea Military Academy, as well as other friends and supporters. The membership to this secret club was predominately restricted to officers from the Gyeongsang Province with just a token membership reserved for a Cholla Province officer. This secret organization's existence within a highly regimented and rigid hierarchical organization of the army was only possible because it was under the patronage of then President Park Chung-hee.

Assassination of Park Chung-hee

On 26 October 1979, South Korean President Park Chung-hee was assassinated by Kim Jae-kyu, Director of the KCIA, while at a dinner party. Secretly, Kim had invited General Jeong Seung-hwa, Army Chief of Staff, and Kim Jeong-seop, Vice-Deputy Director of the KCIA, to dinner in another room that night as well. Although Jeong Seung-hwa was neither present during nor involved in the shooting of the President, his involvement later proved crucial. In the chaos that followed, Kim Jae-kyu was not arrested for many hours, as details of the incident were initially unclear.

After some confusion over the constitutional procedures for presidential succession, Prime Minister Choi Kyu-ha finally ascended to the position of Acting President. Soon after, Jeong named Chun's Security Command to head up the investigation into the mysterious assassination. Chun immediately ordered his subordinates to draw up plans for the creation of an all-powerful "Joint Investigation Headquarters".

On 27 October, Chun called for a meeting in his commander's office. Invited were four key individuals now responsible for all intelligence collection nationwide: KCIA Deputy Chief of Foreign Affairs, KCIA Deputy Chief of Domestic Affairs, Attorney General, and Chief of the National Police. Chun had each person searched at the door on his way in, before having them seated and informing them of the President's death. Chun declared the KCIA held full responsibility for the President's assassination, and its organization was therefore under investigation for the crime. Chun stated that the KCIA would no longer be allowed to exercise its own budget:

Chun subsequently ordered all intelligence reports to now be sent to his office at 8:00 am and 5:00 pm every day, so he could decide what information to give higher command. In one move, Chun had taken control of the entire nation's intelligence organizations. Chun then put the KCIA Deputy Chief of Foreign Affairs in charge of running the day-to-day business of the KCIA.

Major Park Jun-kwang, working under Chun at the time, later commented:

During the investigation and concerned for the welfare of President Park's family, Chun personally gave money (US$500,000) from Park's slush fund to Park Geun-hye, who was 27 at the time. He was reprimanded for this by General Jeong.

12 December coup d’état

In the following month Chun, along with Roh Tae-woo, Yu Hak-seong, Heo Sam-su, and others from the 11th graduating class of the KMA, continued taking advantage of the fragile political situation to grow Hanahoe's strength, courting key commanders and subverting the nation's intelligence gathering organizations.

On 12 December 1979, Chun ordered the arrest of Army Chief of Staff Jeong Seung-hwa on charges of conspiring with Kim Jae-kyu to assassinate the President. This order was made without authorization from President Choi. On the night of Jeong's capture, 29th Regiment, 9th Division, along with the 1st and 3rd Airborne Brigades, invaded downtown Seoul to support the 30th and 33rd Security Group loyal to Chun, then a series of conflicts broke out in the capital. Jang Tae-wan, commander of the Capital Garrison Command, and Jeong Byeong Ju, commander of the special forces, were also arrested by the rebel troops. Major Kim Oh-rang, aide-de-camp of General Jeong Byeong-ju, was killed during the gunfight. By the next morning, the Ministry of Defense and Army HQ were all occupied, and Chun was in firm control of the military. For all intents and purposes, he was now the de facto leader of the country.

In early 1980, Chun was promoted to the rank of lieutenant general, and he took up the position of acting director of the KCIA. On 14 April, Chun was officially installed as director of the KCIA.

Martial law and Gwangju Democratization Movement

On 17 May 1980, Chun expanded martial law to the entire country, due to stated rumors of North Korean infiltration into South Korea. The KCIA manipulated these rumors under the command of Chun. General John A. Wickham (US Armed Forces in Korea) reported that Chun's pessimistic assessment of the domestic situation and his stress on the North Korean threat only seemed to be a pretext for a move into the Blue House (the Korean presidential residence).

To enforce the martial law, troops were dispatched to various parts of the nation. The expanded martial law closed universities, banned political activities, and further curtailed the press. The event of 17 May meant the beginning of another military dictatorship.

Many townsfolk were growing unhappy with the military presence in their cities, and on 18 May, the citizens of Gwangju organized into what became known as the Gwangju Democratization Movement. Chun ordered it to be immediately suppressed, sending in crack military troops with tanks and helicopter gunships to retake City Hall and ordered the troops to exercise full force. This led to a bloody massacre over the next two days, ultimately leading to the collapse of the Gwangju Democratization Movement and the deaths of at least 200 Gwangju activists. For this, he was called "The Butcher of Gwangju" by many people, especially among the students.

Path to the presidency
In June 1980, Chun ordered the National Assembly to be dissolved. He subsequently created the Special Committee for National Security Measures (SCNSM), a junta-like organization, and installed himself as a member. On 17 July, he resigned his position as KCIA Director, and then held only the position of committee member.

On 5 August, with full control of the military he effectively promoted himself to four star General and on 22 August he was discharged from active duty to the Army reserves.

Samchung re-education camp
Beginning in August 1980, citizens were subjected to organized violence under the name of social cleansing, which aimed at the elimination of social ills, such as violence, smuggling, illegal drugs, and deceptions. They were arrested without proper warrants and given ex parte rankings. Some 42,000 victims were enrolled in the Samchung re-education camp for "purificatory education". More than 60,000 people were arrested in six months between August 1980 and January 1981, including many innocent citizens. They faced violence and hard labour in the re-education camp.

Presidency (1980–1987)

Policy
In August 1980, Choi Kyu-hah, who had long since become little more than a figurehead, announced that he would be resigning the presidency. On 27 August, the National Conference for Unification, the nation's electoral college, gathered in Jangchung Arena. Chun was the sole candidate. Out of 2525 members, 2524 voted for Chun with 1 vote counted as invalid, thus with a tally of 99.96% in favor (it was widely speculated at that time that 1 invalid vote was purposely rigged as to differentiate Chun from North Korea's Kim Il-sung, who regularly claimed 100% support in North Korea's elections). He was officially inaugurated into office on 1 September 1980.

On 17 October, he abolished all political parties—including Park's Democratic Republican Party, which had essentially ruled the country as a one-party state since the imposition of the Yushin Constitution. In November, he implemented the Policy for Merger and Abolition of the Press. In January 1981, Chun formed his own party, the Democratic Justice Party; however, for all intents and purposes, it was Park Chung-hee's Democratic Republican Party under a new name. Soon afterward, a new constitution was enacted. It was far less authoritarian than Park's Yushin Constitution; for instance, it enshrined the secrecy of correspondence, banned torture, and invalidated confessions obtained by force. It still vested fairly broad powers in the president, albeit far less sweeping than those Park had held.

He was then re-elected president by the National Conference that February, taking 90 percent of the delegates' vote against three minor candidates. However, Chun's election was a foregone conclusion after the DJP's decisive victory at elections for the National Conference two weeks earlier. The DJP won a supermajority of 69.5 percent of the seats, three times as many as the independents and nine times as seats as the opposition Democratic Korea Party.

Missile memorandum

In 1980, in the face of increased tension with the U.S. over his military takeover, President Chun issued a memorandum stating that his country would not develop missiles with a range longer than 180 km or capable of carrying greater than a 453 kg warhead. After receiving this promise, the Reagan administration decided to fully recognize Chun's military government.

In the late 1990s, South Korea and the U.S. held talks on the issue and, rather than scrap the memorandum completely, they came to an agreement allowing missiles up to 300 km in range and capability to carry up to a 500 kg warhead. This compromise came into effect in 2001 under the name Missile Technology Control Regime.

Removed political influence of Park Chung-hee

After his election in 1981, Chun completely rejected the presidency of Park, even going so far as to strike all references to Park's 1961 military coup from the constitution. Chun announced that he would be restoring justice to the government to remove the fraud and corruption of Park's tenure.

South Korean nuclear weapons program
Chun's government did not have the considerable political influence enjoyed by Park Chung-hee's administration. His government could not ignore American influence, and he ended South Korea's nuclear weapons program. During this time, Chun was worried about the state of South Korean-U.S. relations, which had greatly deteriorated towards the end of Park Chung-hee's long authoritarian presidency. Chun needed to be recognized by the United States to legitimize his government.

Political reforms
After his inauguration, Chun clamped down on out-of-school tutoring and banned individual teaching or tutoring. In September 1980, Chun repealed "guilt by association" laws. In 1981, Chun enacted "Care and Custody" legislation; Chun believed that criminals who finish their prison time for a repeat offense should not be immediately returned to society. During the winter of 1984, before declaring a moratorium on the Korean economy, Chun visited Japan, where he requested a loan for $6 billion. With the military coup taking power and crushing the democratization movements country-wide, the citizens' political demands were being ignored, and in this way the 3S Policy (Sex, Screen, Sports) was passed. Based on right-wing Japanese activist Sejima Ryuzo's proposal, Chun tried to appeal to the citizens in order to ensure the success of the 1988 Seoul Olympics preparations. Chun rapidly enacted various measures to this end, forming professional baseball and soccer leagues, starting the broadcast of color TV throughout the nation as a whole, lessening censorship on sexually suggestive dramas and movies, making school uniforms voluntary, and so forth. In 1981, Chun held a large-scale festival called "Korean Breeze '81 [Kukpung81]", but it was largely ignored by the population.

1983 assassination attempt by North Korea

In 1983, Chun was the target of a failed assassination attempt by North Korean agents during a visit to Rangoon, Burma. The North Korean bombing killed 17 of Chun's entourage, including cabinet ministers. Four Burmese government officials were also killed in the attack.

Foreign policy

Chun's presidency occurred during the Cold War, and his foreign policies were based around combating communism not only from North Korea and Soviet Union.

The United States put pressure on the South Korean government to abandon its plans to develop nuclear weapons.

Japanese newspapers widely reported that Chun was the de facto leader of the country months before he made any move to become President.

In 1982, Chun announced the "Korean People Harmony Democracy Reunification Program", but due to repeated rejections from North Korea the program was unable to get off the ground.

Also from 1986 to 1988, he and President Corazon Aquino of the Philippines established talks between the two countries for strengthening Philippine-South Korean economic, social and cultural friendship.

End of the Fifth Republic (1987)

Noh Shin-yeong
From the start of his presidency, Chun began grooming Noh Shin-yeong as his eventual successor. In 1980, while working as ambassador to the Geneva Representation Bureau, Noh Shin-yeong was recalled and made Minister of Foreign Affairs. In 1982, he was installed as the Director of the Security Planning Bureau, and in 1985, he was named Prime Minister.

When that became widely known, those supporting Chun's regime were highly critical of his choice of successor. His supporters, mostly those with heavy military backgrounds, believed that the proper way to groom a successor was by military duties, not political positions. Chun was eventually persuaded to reverse his position and ceased pushing for Noh Shin-yeong to succeed him.

June Struggle Democratization Movement

The 1981 constitution restricted the president to a single seven-year term. Unlike his predecessors, Chun was unable to amend the document in order to run again in 1987; the constitution explicitly stated that any amendments extending a president's term would not apply to the incumbent. However, he consistently resisted pleas to open up the regime.

On 13 April 1987, Chun made the "". He declared that the DJP candidate for president would be one of his military supporters, and his successor would be chosen in an indirect election similar to the one that elected Chun seven years earlier. That announcement enraged the democratization community and, in concert with several scandals from the Chun government that year, demonstrators began their movement again, starting with a speech at the Anglican Cathedral of Seoul.

Two months later, he declared Roh Tae-woo as the Democratic Justice Party's candidate for president, which, by all accounts, effectively handed Roh the presidency. The announcement triggered the June Democracy Movement, a series of large pro-democracy rallies across the country. In hopes of gaining control over a situation that was rapidly getting out of hand, Roh made a speech promising a much more democratic constitution and the first direct presidential elections in 16 years. On 10 July 1987, Chun resigned as head of the Democratic Justice Party, remaining its Honorary Chairman but handing official leadership of the upcoming campaign to Roh.

1987 presidential election

In the 16 December 1987 presidential election, Roh Tae-woo won the election with a plurality, the first free and fair national elections of any sort held in the country in two decades, after opposition candidates Kim Young-sam and Kim Dae-jung split the popular vote. Chun finished out his term and handed over the presidency to Roh on 25 February 1988, the first peaceful transition of power in the history of South Korea.

Post-presidency and prison sentence (1987–1997)
In February 1988, during the presidency of Roh Tae-woo, Chun was named chair of the National Statesman Committee and so wielded considerable influence in South Korean politics. In that year, the Democratic Justice Party lost its majority in the National Assembly elections to opposition parties, paving the way for the so-called "Fifth Republic Hearings." The National Assembly explored the events of the Gwangju Democratization Movement and where responsibility should lay for the resulting massacre. On 11 November 1988, Chun apologized to the nation in a public address, pledging to give his money and belongings back to the country. Chun resigned from both the National Statesman Committee and the Democratic Justice Party.

At this time, Chun decided to live for several years in Baekdamsa, a Buddhist temple in the Gangwon-do province, in order to pay penance for his actions. On 30 December 1990, Chun left Baekdamsa and returned home.

Investigations, trials, and prison sentences of Chun and Roh

After Kim Young-sam's inauguration as President of South Korea in 1993, Kim declared that Chun Doo-hwan and Roh Tae-woo had stolen 400 billion won (nearly $370 million) from the South Korean people, and he would conduct internal investigations to prove this.

On 16 November 1995, the citizens’ demands were growing louder about the 12 December 1979 military coup and the bloody 5–18 Gwangju Democratization Movement incident, so Kim Young-sam announced the beginning of a movement to enact retroactive legislation, naming the bill Special Act on 5–18 Democratization Movement. As soon as the Constitutional Court declared Chun's actions unconstitutional, the prosecutors began a reinvestigation. On 3 December 1995, Chun and 16 others were arrested on charges of conspiracy and insurrection. At the same time, an investigation into the corruption of their presidencies was begun.

In March 1996, their public trial began. On 26 August, the Seoul District Court issued a death sentence. On 17 April 1997, the judgment was finalized in the Supreme Court. Chun was officially convicted of leading an insurrection, conspiracy to commit insurrection, taking part in an insurrection, illegal troop movement orders, dereliction of duty during martial law, murder of superior officers, attempted murder of superior officers, murder of subordinate troops, leading a rebellion, conspiracy to commit rebellion, taking part in a rebellion, and murder for the purpose of rebellion, as well as assorted crimes relating to bribery.

After his sentence was finalized, Chun began serving his prison sentence. On 22 December 1997, Chun's life imprisonment sentence was commuted by President Kim Young-sam, on the advice of incoming President Kim Dae-jung. Chun was still required to pay his massive fine, but at that point, he had only paid , not quite a fourth of the total fine amount. Chun made a relatively famous quote, saying, "I have only  to my name." The remaining  was never collected.

Later life (1998–2021)

Revocation of related military awards
According to the "May 18th Special Legislation", all medals awarded for the military intervention during the Gwangju Democratization Movement were revoked and ordered to be returned to the government. There are still nine medals that have not been returned to the government.

Confiscation of artworks
Television footage showed them hauling away paintings, porcelain, and expensive artifacts. Among the properties searched were two warehouses owned by publisher Chun Jae-guk, Chun's eldest son, which contained more than 350 pieces of art by famous Korean artists, some estimated to be worth .

The National Assembly passed a bill called the Chun Doo-hwan Act, extending the statute of limitations on confiscating assets from public officials who have failed to pay fines. Under the old law, prosecutors had only until October 2013, but the new law extends the statute of limitations on Chun's case until 2020 and allows prosecutors to collect from his family members as well if it is proven that any of their properties originated from Chun's illegal funds.

Memoirs
Chun tried to publish three memoirs. On 4 August 2017, a court granted a petition from a group of organizations dedicated to the 18 May movement, to prohibit the publishing, sale, and distribution of the works unless 33 sections containing false statements about the 18 May Movement were removed. The court ruled that Chun and his son, Chun Jae-guk, who runs a publishing company, should take steps to prevent the books being sold—a violation of the order would incur a 5 million won fine, to be paid to the 5.18 Memorial Foundation. In October 2017, Chun reissued his memoirs prompting a second lawsuit to be filed against him. On 15 May 2018, the Gwangju District Court granted a further injunction request; in addition to the 33 sections containing false statements about the 18 May Movement found at the time of the first lawsuit, a further 36 sections were found to make false statements about the Movement.

Libel trial and health problems (2019–2021)
In March 2019, Chun appeared in a libel trial in Gwangju over his controversial memoirs, in which he allegedly defamed victims of his 1980 crackdown. Chun had refuted a testimony by the late activist priest, Cho Chul-hyun, and called him "Satan wearing a mask" in his memoirs. The priest allegedly witnessed the military firing at citizens from helicopters during the crackdown. On 30 November 2020, Chun was found guilty of defaming Cho Chul-hyun and was sentenced to eight months in prison, suspended for two years.

Chun proceeded to appeal the sentence but failed to show up to the first and second appellate trials held on 10 May and 14 June 2021. He made his first appearance in the Gwangju District appellate court on 9 August 2021 accompanied by his wife, but looking gaunt and frail. Chun left the courtroom only 25 minutes into the hearing, due to breathing difficulties. He answered some of the judge's questions with the help of his wife and was seen dozing off. A Yonhap news report on 21 August revealed Chun was diagnosed with multiple myeloma.

Death and funeral
Chun died at his home in Yeonhui-dong, Seoul, on 23 November 2021 from complications of blood cancer. Chun died less than one month after his successor Roh Tae-woo.

Since Chun never apologized for his role in the Gwangju Massacre and his past crimes, the Blue House only expressed private condolences to his family via a spokesperson, and announced that there was no plan to send wreaths. Following his death, the South Korean ruling and opposition parties refrained from sending official condolences.

The South Korean government also decided not to hold a state funeral for Chun, and his funeral was conducted by his family with the government providing no assistance.

His remains was taken to Seoul's Severance Hospital, where it was to be cremated before burial. By law, Chun is not eligible for burial at a national cemetery because of his past criminal record and conviction. According to his widow Lee Soon-ja, Chun had requested his family to minimize the funeral process, never make any tomb for him, and spread his ashes in areas overlooking the North Korean territory.

On 23 November 2021, Following Chun's death, during a press conference, Ministry of Foreign Affairs of China spokesperson Zhao Lijian offered brief condolences to Chun's family, stating the 'brief exchanges with relevant sides' that he had following the establishment of diplomatic ties between China and South Korea.

On 27 November 2021, during his funeral procession, Lee Soon-ja issued a brief apology over the "pains and scars" caused by Chun's brutal rule. Her apology did not mention Chun's responsibility of the suppression of May 18 Democratic Uprising in Gwangju. As a result, civic groups related to the movement, including those of bereaved families, criticized her apology for being vague and incomplete, and said that they would not accept the apology.

On 16 March 2023, one of Chun's grandsons Chun Woo-won posted on Instagram, telling of his disgust and repulsion at his grandfather's acts, and stated that his parents were living off the illegal wealth accumulated by Chun and his family. He called his grandfather a "slaughterer", calling him a criminal instead of a hero.

Honours
 : Honorary Recipient of the Order of the Crown of the Realm (1981) 
 : Knight of Order of the Rajamitrabhorn (1981)

In popular culture
 Chun was portrayed by South Korean actor Lee Deok-hwa in the 2005 MBC television series 5th Republic.
 Chun was referenced in the 2015 South Korean television series Reply 1988.
 The 2012 South Korean film 26 Years has a plot of an assassination plan of Chun.
 A fictional South Korean president, modelled after Chun Doo-hwan, is portrayed in a cameo by an unknown actor in the 2021 JTBC drama series Snowdrop.

Notes

References

External links

Former S. Korean dictator Chun Doo-hwan dies unapologetic and unrepentant -- Hankyoreh Nov.23,2021

 
1931 births
2021 deaths
20th-century South Korean politicians
Converts to Buddhism from Roman Catholicism
Deaths from multiple myeloma
Deaths from cancer in South Korea
Democratic Justice Party politicians
Directors of the Korean Central Intelligence Agency
Far-right politics in South Korea
Fifth Republic of Korea
Heads of government who were later imprisoned
Korea Military Academy alumni
Korean people of the Vietnam War
Leaders who took power by coup
People from South Gyeongsang Province
Politicide perpetrators
Presidents of South Korea
Recipients of South Korean presidential pardons
Recipients of the Order of Merit for National Foundation
South Korean Buddhists
Human rights abuses in South Korea
South Korean anti-communists
South Korean mass murderers
South Korean military personnel
South Korean politicians convicted of crimes
South Korean prisoners sentenced to death
Special forces personnel
Prisoners sentenced to death by South Korea
People convicted of treason against South Korea